The 2022 Michelin Pilot Challenge was the twenty-third season of the IMSA SportsCar Challenge and the ninth season organized by the International Motor Sports Association (IMSA). The season began on January 27 at Daytona International Speedway and concluded on October 1 at Road Atlanta. This season also saw the return of former IndyCar driver Robert Wickens after his horrific accident at the 2018 ABC Supply 500 left him as a paraplegic.

Classes
 Grand Sport (GS) (run to GT4 regulations)
 Touring Car (TCR)

Calendar
The provisional 2022 calendar was released on August 6, 2021 at IMSA's annual State of the Sport Address, featuring ten rounds.

Calendar Changes
Canadian Tire Motorsport Park (Mosport) returned to the calendar after being cancelled for 2020 and 2021 due to the COVID-19 pandemic.
The second round at Watkins Glen International, which served as the replacement for Canadian Tire Motorsport Park in 2021, did not return to the schedule.

Series news
2022 marked the introduction of the Bronze Cup, a sub-championship of the GS class in which all-Bronze driver lineups would score points towards their own championship alongside the overall GS classification.

Entry list

Grand Sport

Touring Car

Race results 
Bold indicates overall winner.

Championship standings

Points systems 
Championship points are awarded in each class at the finish of each event. Points are awarded based on finishing positions in the race as shown in the chart below.

 Drivers points

Points are awarded in each class at the finish of each event.

 Team points

Team points are calculated in exactly the same way as driver points, using the point distribution chart. Each car entered is considered its own "team" regardless if it is a single entry or part of a two-car team.

 Manufacturer points

There are also a number of manufacturer championships which utilize the same season-long point distribution chart. The manufacturer championships recognized by IMSA are as follows:

 Grand Sport (GS): Car manufacturer
 Touring Car (TCR): Car manufacturer

Each manufacturer receives finishing points for its highest finishing car in each class. The positions of subsequent finishing cars from the same manufacturer are not taken into consideration, and all other manufacturers move up in the order.

 Example: Manufacturer A finishes 1st and 2nd at an event, and Manufacturer B finishes 3rd. Manufacturer A receives 35 first-place points while Manufacturer B would earn 32 second-place points.

Driver's Championships

Standings: Grand Sport (GS) 

†: Post-event penalty. Car moved to back of class.

Standings: Touring Car (TCR) 
{|
|

: Post-event penalty. Car moved to back of class.

Team's Championships

Standings: Grand Sport (GS) 
{|
|

†: Post-event penalty. Car moved to back of class.

Standings: Touring Car (TCR) 
{|
|

: Post-event penalty. Car moved to back of class.

Bronze Driver's Cup
{|
|

Manufacturer's Championships

Standings: Grand Sport (GS) 
{|
|

Standings: Touring Car (TCR)